Aiguefonde (meaning deep water) is a commune of the Tarn department in southern France.

Geography
The Thoré forms part of the commune's northern border.

Population

See also
Communes of the Tarn department

References

Communes of Tarn (department)